The 3rd Politburo of the Workers' Party of Vietnam (WPV), formally the 3rd Political Bureau of the Central Committee of the Workers' Party of Vietnam (Vietnamese: Bộ Chính trị Ban Chấp hành trung ương Đảng Lao động Việt Nam III), was elected at the 1st Plenary Session of the 3rd Central Committee in the immediate aftermath of the 3rd National Congress.

Composition

Members

Alternates

References

Bibliography
 Chân dung 19 ủy viên Bộ Chính trị khóa XII

.3
1960 in Vietnam
1976 in Vietnam